Christus Dolens or Christ as the Man of Sorrows is a tempera on panel painting by Bramantino, executed c. 1490, in the Museo Thyssen-Bornemisza in Madrid. The original Thyssen-Bornemisza Collection acquired it in 1937 from Countess Teresa Soranza-Mocenigo. A similar work by Bramantino is in the Museo della Certosa in Pavia.

The painting was recorded in the Della Porta Pusterla family collection in Milan in 1590, where it remained until the first quarter of the 20th century. It was published for the first time by Müller Walde in 1898 and various studies attributed it to Bramantino or Bramante. In 1905 William Suida was the first to suggest an attribution to Bramantino. Mulazzini dated it to 1490, early in Bramantino's career.

Description and style
The work represents Christ as a Man of Sorrows, frontal, half-length up to the knee, but it may also want to represent the Resurrection. Against the background of a ruined architecture (possibly the sepulcher) and a lunar landscape (with a river, trees and a sailing ship), the emaciated body of Christ stands out very close to the viewer, of a stony whiteness, wrapped in a mantle that draws deep creased paper-like folds, derived from the Nordic painting.

A feeling of austerity and compassion prevails towards the figure who solemnly shows the signs of martyrdom, with an incisive graphic definition of the forms. Instead of the triumphant over death, Christ is depicted with red eyes, an expression of intense suffering and sadness, an almost ghostly pale body, drawn with great precision, as can be seen in the fingers, tendons of the outstretched arm and muscles and chest. The expression of Christ is powerful enough to focus the observer's attention on the sphere of emotions, which is the aspect Bramantino was most interested in presenting.

References

Paintings by Bramantino
Paintings in the Thyssen-Bornemisza Museum
Paintings of Christus Dolens
1490 paintings